Zonitis fogoensis is a species of blister beetles of the family Meloidae. It is endemic to Cape Verde, where it occurs on the island of Fogo. The specific name fogoensis refers to its type locality, the island of Fogo.

References

Meloidae
Beetles of Africa
Beetles described in 1985
Insects of Cape Verde
Fauna of Fogo, Cape Verde